Cloudy Hill or Kau Lung Hang Shan (Chinese: 九龍坑山) is a 440m high hill in Tai Po District of northeastern Hong Kong. It is located within Pat Sin Leng Country Park.

The source of the Ma Wat River is located on Cloudy Hill. Some parts of the hiking trail are very difficult to walk. Stage 9 of the Wilson Trail starts from the top of the hill.

See also

List of mountains, peaks and hills in Hong Kong
Wilson Trail
Tai Po

Tai Po District
Mountains, peaks and hills of Hong Kong